Sivinsky District is an administrative district (raion) of Perm Krai, Russia; one of the thirty-three in the krai. Municipally, it is incorporated as Sivinsky Municipal District. It is located in the west of the krai. Its administrative center is the rural locality (a selo) of Siva. Population:  The population of Siva accounts for 31.4% of the district's total population.

Geography
The Obva River flows through the district. One-third of the territory is forested.

The district has the least favorable geographical position within the krai, because it situated far from the main economic centers.

History
The district was established in January 1924. It was abolished on February 1, 1963 but restored on January 12, 1965.

Demographics
Ethnic composition:
Russians: 96.1%
Komi-Permyak people: 1%

Notable residents 

Anatoly Sidorov (born 1958), Army commander, born in Siva

References

Notes

Sources

Districts of Perm Krai
States and territories established in 1924
States and territories disestablished in 1963
States and territories established in 1965